This is a list of the leading drop goal scorers in rugby union test matches, with a minimum of ten test drop goals. Test caps are awarded by a player's national union, regardless of whether the opposition recognise it as such. Note, however, that if one nation grants a match test status and the opponents do not then only the statistics for the nation granting test status are counted in test totals. Composite teams made up of players selected from multiple unions—for example the British and Irish Lions and Pacific Islanders—are also considered test teams because they are selected by a group of recognised national governing bodies.

Only teams for which a player has scored a test drop goal are included in the table; players may have played for other test sides. Table including matches played 13 July 2021:

List
Players who are still active at international level are in bold.

See also
 List of leading rugby union test try scorers
 List of leading rugby union test point scorers
 List of rugby union test caps leaders
 International rugby union player records

References

Drop
Drop goal scorers